The Biggest Loser Brunei is a Bruneian reality television show that began broadcasting on BNC in 2010. The show is an adaptation of the American reality TV show The Biggest Loser. It features a host and personal trainers who help the contestants lose weight. The show features obese people competing to win a cash prize by losing the highest percentage of weight relative to their initial weight.

In May 2010, the first season was aired and the winner was Ali, who lost . The second season premiered on October 7, 2011 and Muhammad Zahin was given the title of The Biggest Loser. The third season  premiered on March 13, 2012. In this season, for the first time, a female contestant won the show; Hannah lost 111 pounds and her percentage of weight loss was 45.87%.

Renewal
 Starting in season 2, all units of the scales used the unit of the pound, which was preferred by the audience.
 In season 2, The Biggest Loser Brunei introduced Emma Pangiran Raden as co-host.
 In season 2, this show also introduced The Commando who trained contestants at the Biggest Loser Campus.
 Cristine Phoebe replaced Juliana Mikael, who did not return for the third season.

Criticism
During the first season, Muslims criticized the program since the broadcast coincided with Maghrib, during which Muslims are only supposed to pray. The second season was broadcast at 8.30 pm.

Seasons
Each season has its own theme and gameplay. During the first season, the game was in the basic format of The Biggest Loser. Starting from season 2, the theme was altered. In season 3, unlike the first two seasons, players were divided into teams of three and had varying colours.

As has been done on the United States version of The Biggest Loser, there is a season that involves participants in pairs, which is called "Couples". However, the Brunei version does not have a Couples season. This is to prove that the contestants are able to lose weight as themselves without their loved ones on the show.

Leaderboard

Grand prize winner

At-home winner

Mass media in Brunei
Brunei